TIRF may refer to:
 Total internal reflection fluorescence microscope
 Traffic Injury Research Foundation, in partnership with Toyota Canada Inc.
 Trans-inclusionary radical feminism